Zaslow is a surname. Notable people with the surname include:

Jeffrey Zaslow (1958–2012), American author and journalist
Jonathan Zaslow (born 1981), sports radio show host in South Florida
Lori Zaslow, New York City matchmaker
Michael Zaslow (1942—1998), actor

See also
Zislow
Zasław (disambiguation)